Crinitaria is a genus of flowering plants in the daisy family. Three species are accepted:
Crinitaria grimmii (Regel & Schmalh.) Grierson
Crinitaria pontica (Lipsky) Czerep.
Crinitaria tatarica (Less.) Czerep.

References

Astereae
Asteraceae genera